The HB-F9P was a Sony MSX2-computer, launched in 1985. The abbreviation HB stands for Hit Bit.

The HB-F9P was unusual in the sense that it did not come with a built in floppy disk drive, instead it had a built in software suite "Memovision" that would run automatically unless a program cartridge was inserted in the cartridge slot or the GRAPH key was pressed during booting. Memovision could store data on the special HBI-55 (battery backed RAM) "data cartridge"  that Sony originally had developed, for their HB-55 and HB-75 MSX1 computers. These systems contained a simple built in program called the "Personal Databank".  Memovision was a continuation of the same idea, but much extended, as it contained stuff like a (birthday) calendar with alarm system, a "family databank"  (a combination of a text editor and database) a built in calculator and a timer and time calculator, all rendered in pseudo 3D style.

Variants 
Of the HB-F9 there were many different localized variants produced:
HB-F9P, with QWERTY-keyboard layout was designed for the PAL-standard, and meant for European countries, except Germany, France, Spain and the former Soviet Union.
HB-F9R, had a Russian keyboard.
HB-F9D, had a QWERTZ-keyboard for the German market
HB-F9F, had an AZERTY-keyboard for the French market, and was designed for the SECAM-standard.
HB-F9S, had a modified QWERTY-keyboard for the Spanish market.

Technical specifications 
Processor
 Sharp LH-0080 or NEC μPD780C
memory
ROM: 96 KB
MSX BASIC version 2.0: 48 KB
software suite: 48 KB
RAM
VRAM: 128 KB
main memory: 128 KB
Video
VDP
Yamaha V9938
text: 80×24, 40×24 en 32×24 (characters per line × lines) four colors, two foreground colors and two background colors
graphical: maximal 512×212 pixels (16 colors of 512) and 256×212 (256 colors)
colors: 512 maximal
Engine
MSX-Engine: S-1985
real-time clock with trickle-charged battery backup
sound
 Yamaha YM2149 PSG
 3 sound channels and one noise channel
 8 octaves
Interfaces
power cord
RF-output
CVBS monitor
luminance output
monochrome switch
headset sound output
data-recorder I/O (1200/2400 baud)
1 general purpose expansion connector
printer
keyboard
2 joysticks
2 cartridge slots

References 

MSX
Sony